The Arabic alphabet (or), or Arabic abjad, is the Arabic script as it is codified for writing Arabic. It is written from right to left in a cursive style and includes 28 letters. Most letters have contextual letterforms.

The Arabic alphabet is considered an abjad, meaning it only uses consonants, but it is now considered an "impure abjad". As with other impure abjads, such as the Hebrew alphabet, scribes later devised means of indicating vowel sounds by separate vowel diacritics.

Consonants
The basic Arabic alphabet contains 28 letters. Adaptations of the Arabic script for other languages added and removed some letters, as for example Persian, Ottoman Turkish, Kurdish, Urdu, Sindhi, Azerbaijani (in Iran), Malay, Pashto, Punjabi, Uyghur, Arwi and Arabi Malayalam, all of which have additional letters as shown below. There are no distinct upper and lower case letter forms.

Many letters look similar but are distinguished from one another by dots above or below their central part. These dots are an integral part of a letter, since they distinguish between letters that represent different sounds. For example, the Arabic letters ب (b), ت (t) and ث (th) have the same basic shape, but have one dot below, two dots above and three dots above, respectively. The letter ن (n) also has the same form in initial and medial forms, with one dot above, though it is somewhat different in isolated and final form.

Both printed and written Arabic are cursive, with most of the letters within a word directly connected to the adjacent letters.

Alphabetical order
There are two main collating sequences for the Arabic alphabet: abjad and hija.

The original  order, used for lettering, derives from the order of the Phoenician alphabet, and is therefore similar to the order of other Phoenician-derived alphabets, such as the Hebrew alphabet. In this order, letters are also used as numbers, Abjad numerals, and possess the same alphanumeric code/cipher as Hebrew gematria and Greek isopsephy.

The  or  order, used where lists of names and words are sorted, as in phonebooks, classroom lists, and dictionaries, groups letters by similarity of shape.

Abjadī 
The  order is not a simple historical continuation of the earlier north Semitic alphabetic order, since it has a position corresponding to the Aramaic letter samekh/semkat , yet no letter of the Arabic alphabet historically derives from that letter. The six other letters that do not correspond to any north Semitic letter are placed at the end.

This is commonly vocalized as follows:
 .
Another vocalization is:
 

This can be vocalized as:
   
Modern dictionaries and other reference books do not use the  order to sort alphabetically; instead, the newer  order is used wherein letters are partially grouped together by similarity of shape. The  order is never used as numerals.

Another kind of  order was used widely in the Maghreb until recently  (The Maghreb alphabet is still used in many Quranic schools in Algeria) when it was replaced by the Mashriqi order.

Letter forms

The Arabic alphabet is always cursive and letters vary in shape depending on their position within a word. Letters can exhibit up to four distinct forms corresponding to an initial, medial (middle), final, or isolated position (IMFI). While some letters show considerable variations, others remain almost identical across all four positions. Generally, letters in the same word are linked together on both sides by short horizontal lines, but six letters can only be linked to their preceding letter. For example,  (Ararat) has only isolated forms because each letter cannot be connected to its following one. In addition, some letter combinations are written as ligatures (special shapes), notably  , which is the only mandatory ligature (the un-ligated combination  is considered difficult to read).

Table of basic letters

Notes

 See the article Romanization of Arabic for details on various transliteration schemes. Arabic language speakers may usually not follow a standardized scheme when transcribing words or names. Some Arabic letters which don't have an equivalent in English (such as ق) are often spelled as numbers when Romanized. Also names are regularly transcribed as pronounced locally, not as pronounced in Literary Arabic (if they were of Arabic origin).
 Regarding pronunciation, the phonemic values given are those of Modern Standard Arabic, which is taught in schools and universities. In practice, pronunciation may vary considerably from region to region. For more details concerning the pronunciation of Arabic, consult the articles Arabic phonology and varieties of Arabic.
 The names of the Arabic letters can be thought of as abstractions of an older version where they were meaningful words in the Proto-Semitic language. Names of Arabic letters may have quite different names popularly.
 Six letters do not have a distinct medial form and have to be written with their final form without being connected to the next letter. Their initial form matches the isolated form. The following letter is written in its initial form, or isolated form if it is the final letter in the word.
 The letter  originated in the Phoenician alphabet as a consonant-sign indicating a glottal stop.
 Arabic currently uses a diacritic sign, called , to denote the glottal stop , written alone or with a carrier:
 alone: 
 with a carrier:  (above or under an ),  (above a ),  (above a dotless  or ).

The  has a single form, since it is never linked to a preceding or following letter.

 Variations 

Alif

Modified letters
The following are not individual letters, but rather different contextual variants of some of the Arabic letters.

Ligatures

The use of ligature in Arabic is common. There is one compulsory ligature, that for  ل +  ا, which exists in two forms. All other ligatures, of which there are many, are optional.

A more complex ligature that combines as many as seven distinct components is commonly used to represent the word .

The only ligature within the primary range of Arabic script in Unicode (U+06xx) is  + . This is the only one compulsory for fonts and word-processing. Other ranges are for compatibility to older standards and contain other ligatures, which are optional.
  +  
Note: Unicode also has in its Presentation Form B FExx range a code for this ligature. If your browser and font are configured correctly for Arabic, the ligature displayed above should be identical to this one, U+FEFB ARABIC LIGATURE LAM WITH ALEF ISOLATED FORM:
 

 U+0640 ARABIC TATWEEL +  +  
Note: Unicode also has in its Presentation Form B U+FExx range a code for this ligature. If your browser and font are configured correctly for Arabic, the ligature displayed above should be identical to this one:
 U+FEFC ARABIC LIGATURE LAM WITH ALEF FINAL FORM
 

Another ligature in the Unicode Presentation Form A range U+FB50 to U+FDxx is the special code for glyph for the ligature  ("God"), U+FDF2 ARABIC LIGATURE ALLAH ISOLATED FORM:
 

This is a work-around for the shortcomings of most text processors, which are incapable of displaying the correct vowel marks for the word  in Koran. Because Arabic script is used to write other texts rather than Koran only, rendering  +  +  as the previous ligature is considered faulty.

If one of a number of the fonts (Noto Naskh Arabic, mry_KacstQurn, KacstOne, Nadeem, DejaVu Sans, Harmattan, Scheherazade, Lateef, Iranian Sans, Baghdad, DecoType Naskh) is installed on a computer (Iranian Sans is supported by Wikimedia web-fonts), the word will appear without diacritics.
  +  +  = LILLĀH (meaning "to Allāh [only to God]")   or   لله 
  +  +  +  = ALLĀH (the Arabic word for "god")
   or   الله 
  +  +  + U+0651 ARABIC SHADDA + U+0670 ARABIC LETTER SUPERSCRIPT ALEF +   اللّٰه   (DejaVu Sans and KacstOne don't show the added superscript Alef)

An attempt to show them on the faulty fonts without automatically adding the gemination mark and the superscript alif, although may not display as desired on all browsers, is by adding the U+200d (Zero width joiner) after the first or second  ( +)  +  + U+200d ZERO WIDTH JOINER +     ‎   

Gemination

Gemination is the doubling of a consonant. Instead of writing the letter twice, Arabic places a W-shaped sign called , above it. Note that if a vowel occurs between the two consonants the letter will simply be written twice. The diacritic only appears where the consonant at the end of one syllable is identical to the initial consonant of the following syllable. (The generic term for such diacritical signs is ).

Nunation

Nunation is the addition of a final   to a noun or adjective. The vowel before it indicates grammatical case. In written Arabic nunation is indicated by doubling the vowel diacritic at the end of the word.

 Vowels 
Users of Arabic usually write long vowels but omit short ones, so readers must utilize their knowledge of the language in order to supply the missing vowels. However, in the education system and particularly in classes on Arabic grammar these vowels are used since they are crucial to the grammar. An Arabic sentence can have a completely different meaning by a subtle change of the vowels. This is why in an important text such as the  the three basic vowel signs (see below) are mandated, like the ḥarakāt and all the other diacritics or other types of marks, for example the cantillation signs.

Short vowels

In the Arabic handwriting of everyday use, in general publications, and on street signs, short vowels are typically not written. On the other hand, copies of the  cannot be endorsed by the religious institutes that review them unless the diacritics are included. Children's books, elementary school texts, and Arabic-language grammars in general will include diacritics to some degree. These are known as "vocalized" texts.

Short vowels may be written with diacritics placed above or below the consonant that precedes them in the syllable, called . All Arabic vowels, long and short, follow a consonant; in Arabic, words like "Ali" or "alif", for example, start with a consonant: , .

Long vowels
Briefly,  = ;  = ; and  = .

The table below shows vowels placed above or below a dotted circle replacing a primary consonant letter or a  sign. For clarity in the table, the primary letters on the left used to mark these long vowels are shown only in their isolated form. Additionally, the letter  in the last row may connect to the letter on its left, and then will use a medial or initial form. Use the table of primary letters to look at their actual glyph and joining types.

Here also, the table shows long vowel letters only in isolated form for clarity.

Diphthongs

Vowel omission
An Arabic syllable can be open (ending with a vowel) or closed (ending with a consonant):
 open: CV [consonant-vowel] (long or short vowel)
 closed: CVC (short vowel only)

A normal text is composed only of a series of consonants plus vowel-lengthening letters; thus, the word qalb, "heart", is written qlb, and the word qalaba "he turned around", is also written qlb.

To write qalaba without this ambiguity, we could indicate that the l is followed by a short a by writing a fatḥah above it.

To write qalb, we would instead indicate that the l is followed by no vowel by marking it with a diacritic called sukūn, like this: .

This is one step down from full vocalization, where the vowel after the q would also be indicated by a fatḥah: .

The Qurʾān is traditionally written in full vocalization.

The long i sound in some editions of the Qur’ān is written with a kasrah followed by a diacritic-less y, and long u by a ḍammah followed by a bare w. In others, these y and w carry a sukūn. Outside of the Qur’ān, the latter convention is extremely rare, to the point that y with sukūn will be unambiguously read as the diphthong , and w with sukūn will be read .

For example, the letters  can be read like English meel or mail, or (theoretically) also like mayyal or mayil. By the same token, m-y-t with a sukūn over the y can be mayt but not mayyit or meet, and m-w-t with a sukūn on the w can only be mawt, not moot (iw is impossible when the w closes the syllable).

Vowel marks are always written as if the i‘rāb vowels were in fact pronounced, even when they must be skipped in actual pronunciation. So, when writing the name Aḥmad, it is optional to place a sukūn on the ḥ, but a sukūn is forbidden on the d, because it would carry a ḍammah if any other word followed, as in Aḥmadu zawjī "Ahmad is my husband".

Another example: the sentence that in correct literary Arabic must be pronounced Aḥmadu zawjun shirrīr "Ahmad is a wicked husband", is usually mispronounced (due to influence from vernacular Arabic varieties) as Aḥmad zawj shirrīr. Yet, for the purposes of Arabic grammar and orthography, is treated as if it were not mispronounced and as if yet another word followed it, i.e., if adding any vowel marks, they must be added as if the pronunciation were Aḥmadu zawjun sharrīrun with a tanwīn 'un' at the end. So, it is correct to add an un tanwīn sign on the final r, but actually pronouncing it would be a hypercorrection. Also, it is never correct to write a sukūn on that r, even though in actual pronunciation it is (and in correct Arabic MUST be) sukūned.

Of course, if the correct i‘rāb is a sukūn, it may be optionally written.

ٰٰ
The sukūn is also used for transliterating words into the Arabic script.

Additional letters

Regional variations
Some letters take a traditionally different form in specific regions:

Non-native letters to Standard Arabic
Some modified letters are used to represent non-native sounds of Modern Standard Arabic. These letters are used in transliterated names, loanwords and dialectal words.

  is considered a native phoneme/allophone in some dialects, e.g. Kuwaiti and Iraqi dialects.
  is considered a native phoneme (instead of ) in a number of  Levantine and North African dialects and as an allophone in others.
  is considered a native phoneme/allophone in most modern Arabic dialects.

Used in languages other than Arabic

 Numerals 

There are two main kinds of numerals used along with Arabic text; Western Arabic numerals and Eastern Arabic numerals. In most of present-day North Africa, the usual Western Arabic numerals are used. Like Western Arabic numerals, in Eastern Arabic numerals, the units are always right-most, and the highest value left-most. Eastern Arabic numbers are written from left to right.

Letters as numerals

In addition, the Arabic alphabet can be used to represent numbers (Abjad numerals). This usage is based on the  order of the alphabet.   is 1,   is 2,   is 3, and so on until   = 10,   = 20,   = 30, ...,   = 200, ...,   = 1000. This is sometimes used to produce chronograms.

 History 

The Arabic alphabet can be traced back to the Nabataean alphabet used to write Nabataean. However, the epigraphic record is extremely sparse, with only five certainly pre-Islamic Arabic inscriptions surviving, though some others may be pre-Islamic. Later, dots were added above and below the letters to differentiate them. (The Aramaic language had fewer phonemes than the Arabic, and some originally distinct Aramaic letters had become indistinguishable in shape, so that in the early writings 15 distinct letter-shapes had to do duty for 29 sounds; cf. the similarly ambiguous Pahlavi alphabet.) The first surviving document that definitely uses these dots is also the first surviving Arabic papyrus (PERF 558), dated April 643, although they did not become obligatory until much later. Important texts were and still are frequently memorized, especially in Qurʾan memorization.

Initially, this was done by a system of red dots, said to have been commissioned in the Umayyad era by Abu al-Aswad al-Du'ali a dot above = , a dot below = , a dot on the line = , and doubled dots indicated nunation. However, this was cumbersome and easily confusable with the letter-distinguishing dots, so about 100 years later, the modern system was adopted.

 Arabic printing 
Medieval Arabic blockprinting flourished from the 10th century until the 14th. It was devoted only to very small texts, usually for use in amulets.

In 1514, following Gutenberg's invention of the printing press in 1450, Gregorio de Gregorii, a Venetian, published an entire prayer-book in Arabic script; it was entitled Kitab Salat al-Sawa'i and was intended for eastern Christian communities.

Between 1580 and 1586, type designer Robert Granjon designed Arabic typefaces for Cardinal Ferdinando de' Medici, and the Medici press published many Christian prayer and scholarly Arabic texts in the late 16th century.

Maronite monks at the Maar Quzhayy Monastery in Mount Lebanon published the first Arabic books to use movable type in the Middle East. The monks transliterated the Arabic language using Syriac script.

Although Napoleon Bonaparte generally receives credit for introducing the printing press to Egypt during his invasion of that country in 1798, and though he did indeed bring printing presses and Arabic script presses to print the French occupation's official newspaper Al-Tanbiyyah ("The Courier"), printing in the Arabic language started several centuries earlier.

A goldsmith (like Gutenberg) designed and implemented an Arabic-script movable-type printing-press in the Middle East. The Greek Orthodox monk Abd Allah Zakhir set up an Arabic printing press using movable type at the monastery of Saint John at the town of Dhour El Shuwayr in Mount Lebanon, the first homemade press in Lebanon using Arabic script. He personally cut the type molds and did the founding of the typeface. The first book came off his press in 1734; this press continued in use until 1899.

 Computers 
The Arabic alphabet can be encoded using several character sets, including ISO-8859-6, Windows-1256 and Unicode (see links in Infobox above), latter thanks to the "Arabic segment", entries U+0600 to U+06FF. However, none of the sets indicates the form that each character should take in context. It is left to the rendering engine to select the proper glyph to display for each character.

Each letter has a position-independent encoding in Unicode, and the rendering software can infer the correct glyph form (initial, medial, final or isolated) from its joining context. That is the current recommendation. However, for compatibility with previous standards, the initial, medial, final and isolated forms can also be encoded separately.

Unicode

As of Unicode 15.0, the Arabic script is contained in the following blocks:
 Arabic (0600–06FF, 256 characters)
 Arabic Supplement (0750–077F, 48 characters)
 Arabic Extended-A (08A0–08FF, 96 characters)
 Arabic Extended-B (0870–089F, 41 characters)
 Arabic Extended-C (10EC0–10EFF, 3 characters)
 Arabic Presentation Forms-A (FB50–FDFF, 631 characters)
 Arabic Presentation Forms-B (FE70–FEFF, 141 characters)
 Rumi Numeral Symbols (10E60–10E7F, 31 characters)
 Indic Siyaq Numbers (1EC70–1ECBF, 68 characters)
 Ottoman Siyaq Numbers (1ED00–1ED4F, 61 characters)
 Arabic Mathematical Alphabetic Symbols (1EE00—1EEFF, 143 characters)

The basic Arabic range encodes the standard letters and diacritics but does not encode contextual forms (U+0621-U+0652 being directly based on ISO 8859-6). It also includes the most common diacritics and Arabic-Indic digits. U+06D6 to U+06ED encode Qur'anic annotation signs such as "end of ayah" ۝ۖ and "start of rub el hizb" ۞. The Arabic supplement range encodes letter variants mostly used for writing African (non-Arabic) languages. The Arabic Extended-A range encodes additional Qur'anic annotations and letter variants used for various non-Arabic languages.

The Arabic Presentation Forms-A range encodes contextual forms and ligatures of letter variants needed for Persian, Urdu, Sindhi and Central Asian languages. The Arabic Presentation Forms-B range encodes spacing forms of Arabic diacritics, and more contextual letter forms. The Arabic Mathematical Alphabetical Symbols block encodes characters used in Arabic mathematical expressions.

See also the notes of the section on modified letters.

Keyboards

Keyboards designed for different nations have different layouts, so proficiency in one style of keyboard, such as Iraq's, does not transfer to proficiency in another, such as Saudi Arabia's. Differences can include the location of non-alphabetic characters.

All Arabic keyboards allow typing Roman characters, e.g., for the URL in a web browser. Thus, each Arabic keyboard has both Arabic and Roman characters marked on the keys. Usually, the Roman characters of an Arabic keyboard conform to the QWERTY layout, but in North Africa, where French is the most common language typed using the Roman characters, the Arabic keyboards are AZERTY.

To encode a particular written form of a character, there are extra code points provided in Unicode which can be used to express the exact written form desired. The range Arabic presentation forms A (U+FB50 to U+FDFF) contain ligatures while the range Arabic presentation forms B (U+FE70 to U+FEFF) contains the positional variants. These effects are better achieved in Unicode by using the zero-width joiner and zero-width non-joiner, as these presentation forms are deprecated in Unicode and should generally only be used within the internals of text-rendering software; when using Unicode as an intermediate form for conversion between character encodings; or for backwards compatibility with implementations that rely on the hard-coding of glyph forms.

Finally, the Unicode encoding of Arabic is in logical order, that is, the characters are entered, and stored in computer memory, in the order that they are written and pronounced without worrying about the direction in which they will be displayed on paper or on the screen. Again, it is left to the rendering engine to present the characters in the correct direction, using Unicode's bi-directional text features. In this regard, if the Arabic words on this page are written left to right, it is an indication that the Unicode rendering engine used to display them is out of date.See also Multilingual Computing with Arabic and Arabic Transliteration: Arabicizing Windows Applications to Read and Write Arabic & Solutions for the Transliteration Quagmire Faced by Arabic-Script Languages and A PowerPoint Tutorial (with screen shots and an English voice-over) on how to add Arabic to the Windows Operating System. 

There are competing online tools, e.g. Yamli editor, which allow entry of Arabic letters without having Arabic support installed on a PC, and without knowledge of the layout of the Arabic keyboard.

Handwriting recognition
The first software program of its kind in the world that identifies Arabic handwriting in real time was developed by researchers at Ben-Gurion University (BGU).

The prototype enables the user to write Arabic words by hand on an electronic screen, which then analyzes the text and translates it into printed Arabic letters in a thousandth of a second. The error rate is less than three percent, according to Dr. Jihad El-Sana, from BGU's department of computer sciences, who developed the system along with master's degree student Fadi Biadsy.

 See also 

 Abjad numerals
 Ancient South Arabian script
 Algerian braille
 Arabic braille
 Arabic calligraphy
 Arabic chat alphabet
 Arabic diacritics
 Arabic letter frequency
 Arabic Mathematical Alphabetic Symbols
 Arabic numerals
 Arabic phonology
 Arabic script – about other languages written in Arabic script
 ArabTeX – provides Arabic support for TeX and LaTeX
 Kufic
 Modern Arabic mathematical notation
 Perso-Arabic script
 Rasm
 Romanization of Arabic

References

External links

 
 Arabic alphabet learning resourcesThis article contains major sections of text from the very detailed article Arabic alphabet from the French Wikipedia, which has been partially translated into English. Further translation of that page, and its incorporation into the text here, are welcomed.''

 
Arabic orthography